South Bucks District Council was elected every four years from 1973 until 2020.

Political control
From the first election to the council in 1973 until its merger into Buckinghamshire Council in 2020, political control of the council was held by the following parties:

Leadership
The leaders of the council from 1999 until its abolition in 2020 were:

Council elections
1973 Beaconsfield District Council election
1976 Beaconsfield District Council election
1979 Beaconsfield District Council election (District boundary changes took place but the number of seats remained the same)
1983 South Bucks District Council election (New ward boundaries & district boundary changes also took place)
1987 South Bucks District Council election (District boundary changes took place but the number of seats remained the same)
1991 South Bucks District Council election (District boundary changes took place but the number of seats remained the same)
1995 South Bucks District Council election (District boundary changes took place but the number of seats remained the same)
1999 South Bucks District Council election
2003 South Bucks District Council election (New ward boundaries)
2007 South Bucks District Council election (Some new ward boundaries)
2011 South Bucks District Council election
2015 South Bucks District Council election (New ward boundaries)

District result maps

By-election results

References

External links

 
South Bucks District
Council elections in Buckinghamshire
District council elections in England